"Sugar Daddy" is a hit single by the Motown quintet The Jackson 5, released in late 1971.

The song peaked at #3 on the US Best Selling Soul Singles chart and at #10 on the US Billboard Hot 100 pop singles chart in early 1972. "Sugar Daddy" was one of the Jackson 5 hits produced by The Corporation, the group's record production team, composed by Berry Gordy, Freddie Perren, Alphonzo Mizell, and Deke Richards.

The single's B-side is the non-album track "I'm So Happy". Both of these songs were included as bonus tracks on the 2001 re-release of the Jackson 5 studio album Maybe Tomorrow (1971).

Personnel
 Written and produced by The Corporation: Berry Gordy,  Alphonzo Mizell, Freddie Perren and Deke Richards
 Lead vocals by Michael Jackson and Jermaine Jackson
 Background vocals by Michael Jackson, Jermaine Jackson, Tito Jackson, Jackie Jackson, and Marlon Jackson
 Instrumentation by various Los Angeles studio musicians

Charts

References

1971 singles
The Jackson 5 songs
Songs written by Berry Gordy
Songs written by Freddie Perren
Songs written by Deke Richards
Songs written by Alphonzo Mizell